Paul Kauvar was an American Thoroughbred racehorse. He won the 1897 Preakness Stakes. He was sold to Louis Ezell for $1,500 in 1898, but was injured before the Colombia Stakes in October.

References

Thoroughbred family A12
Racehorses bred in the United States
Racehorses trained in the United States
Preakness Stakes winners
1894 racehorse births